Qaleh-ye Bala (also Romanized as Qal‘eh-ye Bālā and Qal‘eh Bālā) is a village in Beyarjomand Rural District, Beyarjomand District, Shahrud County, Semnan Province, Iran. At the 2006 census, its population was 397, in 139 families.

References 

Populated places in Shahrud County